Vijay Sankeshwar is an Indian businessman from Dharwad, Karnataka. He along with Anand Sankeshwar (managing director) is the chairman of India's largest logistics firm VRL Group. He is also known for being the owner of the largest fleet of commercial vehicles in India.

He left BJP and founded the Kannada Nadu Party. Later he joined the Karnataka Janata Paksha of BJP outcast Yeddyurappa; the party eventually merged back with BJP. Sankeshwar was also a former Member of Parliament from North Dharwad constituency as a BJP member.

Sankeshwar previously owned Karnataka's largest circulating newspaper, Vijaya Karnataka, until it was sold to Bennett, Coleman and Co. Ltd. (The Times Group) for an undisclosed sum in 2007. After the expiry of a five-year non-compete clause he launched Vijaya Vani in 2012. Vijaya Vani is now the #1 Kannada daily newspaper, with 8 lakh+ sold copies every day.

Sankeshwar launched a new Kannada channel, Digvijay 24X7, on April 4, 2017.

In 2020, the Government of India honoured him with the Padma Shri, the fourth highest civilian award in the Republic of India.

Personal life
Vijay Sankeshwar was born on 2 August 1950 in Betageri, Gadag Mysore State (now Karnataka) to  Basavanneppa Sankeshwar and Chandrawwa. His father, was a businessman who established the printing press B G Sankeshwar and Co. (now Sankeshwar Printer Private Limited) in Gadag.

Sankeshwar married the Lalitha Sankeshwar on 14 December 1972. Couple had three daughters and a son, Anand Sankeshwar, is the managing director of VRL Logistics Limited.

Education
Sankeshwar obtained a commerce at Adarsh Shikshan Samiti, College of Commerce, Gadag, Karnataka University, Dharwad, Karnataka.

Business career
Vijay got interest in transport business and in 1976 started the cargo business with one truck that he had bought by taking a loan of Rs 2 lakhs. Initially he suffered severe losses due to accidents, no communication, and competition.

In 1978, Vijay Sankeshwar and his family shifted to Hubballi to expand their transport business and brought three more trucks for business. In 1983, started a transport company Vijayanand Roadlines Limited. In beginning of 1990 VRL had 117 commercial vehicles and had turnover more than  crores. In 1993, starts the courier delivery across the Karnataka. Sankeshwar purchase 4 Passenger Buses in 1996, which carry passengers Bangalore to Hubballi.

Political career

In popular culture 
In 2022, Anand Sankeshwar produced the biopic of Vijay Sankeshwar as Vijayanand released on 9 December 2022 in Kannada, Tamil, Telugu, Hindi and Malayalam. The biopic will focus on Sankeshwar’s journey from owning a single truck to making it India’s largest logistics fleet.

References

External links

VRL Group
Living people
People from Gadag-Betageri
1950 births
21st-century Indian politicians
Lok Sabha members from Karnataka
India MPs 1996–1997
India MPs 1998–1999
India MPs 1999–2004
Bharatiya Janata Party politicians from Karnataka
Karnataka Janata Paksha politicians
People from Dharwad district